The 2013 FIA WTCC Race of the United States was the ninth round of the 2013 World Touring Car Championship season and the second running of the FIA WTCC Race of the United States. It was held on 8 September 2013 at the Sonoma Raceway in Sonoma, California, United States.

Race one was won by Tom Chilton of RML, his first victory in the World Touring Car Championship. Race two was won by Gabriele Tarquini of the Castrol Honda World Touring Car Team. Honda secured the 2013 Manufacturers' Championship in race two.

Background
Muller was leading the drivers' championship by 132 points over Michel Nykjær. Muller had his first mathematical opportunity to secure a fourth world title in race two. Nykjær was leading the Yokohama Independents' Trophy.

The Honda Civic WTCCs gained 10 kg under the compensation weight re-calculation to take them up to 1,160 kg. The SEAT León WTCCs lost 10 kg of weight to take them to 1,140 kg, below the base weight of 1,150 kg. The Chevrolets, BMWs and Ladas were not changed.

Fredy Barth returned to Wiechers-Sport, replacing José María López while Tom Boardman returned with Special Tuning Racing.

Report

Testing and free practice
Tiago Monteiro was quickest in Friday's warm–up session, Robert Huff was second. James Thompson  damaged his suspension early on and went on to finish 17th.

Pepe Oriola led a Chevrolet 1–2–3 in free practice one ahead of Chilton and Yvan Muller. The session was stopped early on when the ROAL Motorsport car of Tom Coronel crashed into the barriers at turn 11.

Muller was on top in practice two ahead of Norbert Michelisz and Hugo Valente. The session was briefly stopped with Valente's Campos Racing teammate Fernando Monje crashed into the barriers at turn 9.

Qualifying
Monteiro was the first driver out of the pits at the start of qualifying. Alex MacDowall lost the rear of his Chevrolet Cruze on the exit of turn one and went off the track but he quickly recovered to the circuit, Fernando Monje and Chilton also had similar excursions off the track at the first corner during Q1. Muller was now quickest with the three Honda drivers his nearest challengers until Oriola moved up to third. Marc Basseng put in a quick lap at the end of the session to move into the top twelve and Mehdi Bennani was another late improver at the expense of Coronel. Muller was still quickest at the end of the session with the Hondas of Monteiro and Michelisz second and third.

Monteiro was the first to post a lap time in Q2 which was quickly beaten by Muller, Chilton then slotted into second. After their first runs most of the cars headed back to the pits while Nykjær headed out onto the track to set his time. Tarquini set only one quick lap and went tenth to secure pole position for race two, Chilton then went quickest ahead of Muller to take his first pole position in the WTCC.

After qualifying, the seat positions of NIKA Racing's Nykjær and the Campos Racing pair of Monje and Valente were found not to comply with the regulations. All three drivers lost their qualifying times and were sent to the back of the grid for both races. Michelisz would start race one from the back of the grid following an engine change before qualifying.

Warm-Up
Michelisz was fastest in the morning warm–up session ahead of Thompson, Chilton was sixth.

Race One
Chilton led away from the rolling start while Monteiro passed Muller to move into second place. By the end of the lap Muller was under pressure from the MacDowall. Bennani spun on lap two with Barth having to avoid the spinning BMW, both dropped to near the back of the field as a result. Darryl O'Young came in to the pits after two laps for repairs. On lap three Monteiro began to challenge Chilton for the lead while further back Coronel was challenging Huff for seventh. By lap eight there was a train of cars building up behind Huff with his team-mate Basseng attacking Coronel. On lap ten Coronel was able to pass Huff with a small tap on the back bumper of the SEAT. Chilton successfully converted his first WTCC pole position into his first WTCC victory, leading home Monteiro and Muller complete the podium. Monje and Barth were side–by–side at the finish line with Monje narrowly ahead, ahead of them Nykjær finished 13th having started at the back of the grid.

After the race, Boardman and Monje were given 30–second penalties for speeding during the rolling start, dropping them from 12th and 16th to 21st and 23rd respectively.

Race Two
Tarquini took the lead from Bennani at the second corner while Rene Munnich went off the track. Further behind Muller was beginning his move up the field and took sixth off Monteiro. On lap two Huff slowed down with a right front puncture and returned to the pits. Muller had now caught up with Nash who was keeping the Frenchman at bay and allowing Monteiro to keep up with the Chevrolets. Muller made a pass on lap four at the first hairpin, Monteiro then pulled off a similar move on Nash at the final corner. On lap five Coronel also passed Nash who was now in seventh place having run fourth the previous lap. Charles Ng had a spin at turn 6 and after kicking up plenty of dust he was able to continue. Bennani in second was being challenged by Michelisz while Barth passed Nash on lap nine after two laps of trying to overtake. Basseng was tenth with race one retiree O'Young was trying to make a move on the SEAT with race one winner Chilton behind O'Young. On lap 11 Michelisz was beginning to struggle with the pressure of having Muller behind him, the loose rear end of his car producing puffs of smoke from his tyres at several corners around the lap. Chilton had a slide at turn two at the start of lap 12, narrowly avoiding O'Young as he came across the track. Tarquini claimed the victory with Bennani taking second and the independents' victory having suffered from steering problems throughout the race, Michelisz held onto third place ahead of Muller. Honda secured the world manufacturers championship.

Results

Qualifying

Bold denotes Pole position for second race.

 Nykjær, Monje and Valente were excluded from qualifying when it was found their seat positions breached the regulations.

Race 1

Bold denotes Fastest lap.

Race 2

Bold denotes Fastest lap.

Standings after the event

Drivers' Championship standings

Yokohama Independents' Trophy standings

Manufacturers' Championship standings

 Note: Only the top five positions are included for both sets of drivers' standings.

References

External links
World Touring Car Championship official website

United States
Race of the United States